Zinora M. Mitchell-Rankin (born April 16, 1956) is a senior judge on the Superior Court of the District of Columbia.

Education and career 
Mitchell-Rankin earned her Bachelor of Arts from Spelman College in 1976 and her Juris Doctor from George Washington University Law School in 1979.

After graduating, she joined the Justice Department as a trial attorney.

D.C. Superior Court 
President George H. W. Bush nominated Mitchell-Rankin on September 29, 1989, to a 15-year term as an associate judge on the Superior Court of the District of Columbia to the seat vacated by Reggie Barnett Walton. On November 16, 1989, the Senate Committee on Homeland Security and Governmental Affairs held a hearing on her nomination. On November 17, 1989, the Committee reported her nomination favorably to the Senate floor. November 19, 1989, the full Senate confirmed her nomination by voice vote. Mitchell-Rankin served as an associate judge from until January 12, 1990 until February 29, 2012. As of 2019, she serves as a senior judge on the court.

Personal life 
Mitchell-Rankin was born and raised in Washington D.C. She is married to fellow D.C. Superior Court judge Michael Rankin and they have four children.

See also
List of first women lawyers and judges in Washington D.C. (Federal District)

References

Living people
George Washington University Law School alumni
Spelman College alumni
Judges of the Superior Court of the District of Columbia
American women judges
1956 births